Todd Brooker (born November 24, 1959) is a former alpine ski racer member Crazy Canucks and a ski commentator on television.

World Cup career
Born in Waterloo, Ontario, Brooker learned to ski and race at Blue Mountain, near Collingwood and made the Canadian national team in 1977; he competed on the World Cup circuit from December 1981 to January 1987. A younger member of the Crazy Canucks (Canada's downhill team) of the early 1980s Brooker won two World Cup downhill races at (Kitzbühel & Aspen) in 1983 finishing ninth in the season's overall downhill standings. Two years later he won the downhill race in Furano, Japan finishing seventh in the 1985 downhill standings.

Brookers rise to world class prominence placed him 13th at the 1982 World Championships, ninth in the downhill in both the 1984 Winter Olympics and the 1985 World Championships.

The Hahnenkamm in Kitzbühel, Austria, is arguably the most physically and mentally demanding race on the downhill skiing world cup circuit. The Streif course is one of the most respected and feared downhill courses. A victory is a badge of honor, if not a bragging right to even the most seasoned and decorated racer. From 1980 to 1983, Canadians Ken Read, Steve Podborski, and Brooker broke the European dominance of victory at Kitzbühel.

After returning from a knee injury, Brooker's ski racing career ended in Kitzbühel at the top of the Zielschuss in January 1987 with the most gut wrenching spectacular ragdoll head-over-heels cartwheeling fall ever captured on film. When asked about the video, Brooker has remarked that everyone remembers his Kitzbühel fall, except for him. The crash in the Friday training run ended his season and racing career.

Brooker finished his World Cup career with three victories, seven podiums, and 15 top ten finishes, all in downhill.

World Cup results

Season standings

Race podiums
 3 wins – (3 DH)
 7 podiums – (7 DH)

World championship results

Olympic results

Post-racing career
Brooker has been a ski commentator on television for a number of years, and has worked for most of the major networks in North America. He has covered alpine skiing for numerous Winter Olympics for U.S. television, and currently provides commentary and analysis on CBC in Canada during the World Cup ski season.  Brooker covered alpine skiing at the 2010 Winter Olympics for NBC in the United States.

Brooker lives on a farm in rural Ontario near Thornbury, with his wife and three daughters.

Crabbe Mountain Speed Camp
Brooker also made an appearance at the 2011 Crabbe Mountain Speed Camp, a camp where kids from across Atlantic Canada go to learn the discipline known as Super G.

See also
 Crazy Canucks

References

External links
 
 
 Canadian Ski Hall of Fame – Todd Brooker – inducted 1991

1959 births
Alpine skiers at the 1984 Winter Olympics
Canadian male alpine skiers
Canadian sports announcers
Living people
Olympic alpine skiers of Canada
Olympic Games broadcasters
Skiing announcers
Sportspeople from Ontario
Sportspeople from Waterloo, Ontario